Dr. Mary Styles Harris, Ph.D. (born June 26, 1949, Nashville, Tennessee) is an American Biologist and Geneticist, president of Harris & Associates in Atlanta, Georgia, and owner of BioTechnical Communications, which produced the award-winning television documentary “To My Sister…A Gift for Life.”

Harris's media productions spotlight health issues of African Americans. These include campaigning for the need for the early detection of breast cancer, the genetics of sickle-cell anemia and greater understanding of diabetes-related concerns. Other topics explored include AIDS, cervical cancer, colon cancer, hypertension and prostate cancer.

Harris has been an advocate for bridging the gap in transparency in public health education between government officials and scientists so that important health information is made available to the public.

Early life 
Harris was born in Nashville, Tennessee to George and Margaret Styles, while her father was earning his medical degree from the city's Meharry Medical College. Harris mother, Margaret, earned a degree in business administration at Tennessee State University.

Soon after Harris was born the family moved to her father's hometown of Miami, Florida 
where her parents built up her father's medical practice.  However, Harris's father died tragically in 1958 when Harris was nine years old.

Education 
Harris was one of the first African Americans to enroll at Miami Jackson High School, graduating twelfth in her class of 350 in 1967.

She became one of the first women to enroll at Lincoln University in Pennsylvania, spending most of her time with pre-med students. She then turned down a place at the University of Miami Medical School, to pursue a research career.

After graduating from Lincoln University in 1971, Harris enrolled at Cornell University where she studied molecular genetics, supported by a Ford Foundation Doctoral Fellowship. Harris earned her doctorate in 1975 and was a research associate, studying the virology of tumors, in the medical school at Rutgers University from 1975-77.

Career 
After graduating from Cornell, Harris was awarded a post-doctoral fellowship by the National Cancer Institute. She went onto the New Jersey University of Medicine and Dentistry where she researched the genetic composition of viruses.

In 1977, Harris  became the executive director of the Sickle Cell Foundation of Georgia. In this role, she was responsible for raising money for sickle cell research - a condition mainly affecting people of African descent - and for educating the public on the disease. For her work, she received a National Science Foundation Science Residency Award in 1979. This led to a series of documentaries on science and medicine and, in 1980, Harris won the Glamour Magazine's Outstanding Working Woman Award at an award ceremony hosted by President Carter at the White House.

Harris later became the Director of Genetic Services for the Georgia Department of Human Services, with the mandate of influencing public health policies in the state and across the nation. She served as director for three years after which she worked for two years as a project-coordinator of genetic screening of newborn infants, and an Assistant Professor at Morehouse College in 1978 and Atlanta College from 1980-1981.

In 1987, Harris founded BioTechnical Communications, which creates audiovisual educational materials on health topics. Harris has produced television and radio shows, and hosts a call-in radio show, Journey To Wellness: African American Health Radio and developed a documentary, To My Sisters... A Gift For Life, focusing on breast cancer in African American Women.

Personal life 
Harris married her husband Sidney Harris, a Morehouse graduate, shortly after she obtained her doctoral degree. They were both admitted to Cornell University and moved to Ithaca, New York where he had been accepted into a graduate engineering program and she worked at the university's genetics research center. Mary and Sidney Harris have one daughter.

Awards 

 1979-80: Governor’s Advisory Council on Alcohol and Drug Abuse
 1979-80: Women's Forum of Georgia
 1979-80: Georgia Human Genetics Task Force
 1979-80: Congressional Black Caucus Health Brain Trust; Georgia Board of Regents, University of Georgia
 1979-80: board member, CDC Foundation
 1979-80: Scientist in Residence for WGTV Channel 8
 1980: Glamour Magazine's Outstanding Working Woman Award
 1979: National Science Foundation Science Residency Award
 1977: Public health Association, American Society for Human Genetics
 1971: Ford Foundation Doctoral Fellowship

References

Sources

American Men and Women and Science. 16th edition (New York: McGraw-Hill), p. 521.
Blacks in Science and Education. Vivian O. Sammons. (Washington, D.C.: Hemisphere Publishers), 1989. p. 112-113.

External links
Mary Styles Harris at Journeytowellnss.com
Blacknews.com press release
aakulturezone.com
The History Makers biography
Notable African American Scientists

American geneticists
African-American scientists
1949 births
Cornell University alumni
Living people
21st-century African-American people
20th-century African-American people